Dahio Trotwood Airport , also known as Dayton-New Lebanon Airport, is a public-use airport located seven miles (11 km) west of the central business district of Dayton, in Montgomery County, Ohio, United States. It is privately owned by Gary Ridell. The airport is situated between Trotwood to the northeast and New Lebanon to the southwest. Operated as a Drag Strip in the late 1950s.

Facilities and aircraft 

For the 12-month period ending May 29, 2007, the airport had 1,853 aircraft operations, an average of 5 per day, 100% which were general aviation. There are 27 aircraft based at this airport:
16 single-engine, 10 ultralight and 1 multi-engine.

References

External links 

Airports in Ohio
Transportation in Montgomery County, Ohio
Buildings and structures in Montgomery County, Ohio